CALICO, The Computer Assisted Language Instruction Consortium, is a North American-based international scholarly organization, founded in 1983, dedicated to research and development in the use of computer technology in second/foreign language learning and teaching. CALICO has developed alongside the field of CALL or Computer Assisted Language Learning, and includes language educators, educational technology professionals, language technology consultants and language center directors, software designers and developers, and second language acquisition researchers, as well as graduate students in these fields. CALICO special interest groups, which reflect the changing nature of the field, currently include computer-mediated communication, gaming, graduate students, intelligent CALL, language teaching and learning technologies, second language acquisition and technology, teacher education, and virtual worlds. 

CALICO holds an annual conference with workshops at universities and in cities across North America, and has an official presence at related conferences worldwide, as well as relationships with other organizations like ACTFL, IALLT, and EuroCALL. Partnering with Equinox Publishers, it also publishes a book series as well as a scholarly, online-only, fully referenced journal, CALICO Journal.

CALICO is governed by three elected leaders serving one-year rotating terms (President, Vice-President, and Past President), along with a board of six members serving three-year terms.

References

External links
CALICO website

Educational technology academic and professional associations